Radio Corazón is a 2007 Chilean Spanish-language film directed by and starring Roberto Artiagoitía (nicknamed El Rumpy).  It portrays three stories based on phone calls made to El Rumpy's radio program in Chile, El chacotero sentimental.  It was the highest-grossing film for the week in Chile upon its release on October 4, 2007.  The film is a sequel to the 1999 film El Chacotero Sentimental: La película.

The stars of the film include Daniel Muñoz, Manuela Martelli, and Daniel Alcaíno.

Plot 
The popular radio show "The Sentimental Jester" is hosted by El Rumpy, where three individuals call in to share their stories or seek help.

The first caller is a high school senior (Manuela Martelli), who is the only one among her friends who hasn't engaged in sexual relations. She seeks help from her stepfather.

The second caller is a mother (Claudia Di Girólamo) who lives with her daughter-in-law. Suddenly, she finds herself attracted to her daughter-in-law shortly after her son's marriage.

The third caller is a nanny (Tamara Acosta) who works in a mansion as a caregiver for the children. However, the mansion's owner has a terminal illness, and the nanny must take some measures before her passing.

Cast
 Daniel Muñoz - Manolo Tapia
 Manuela Martelli - Nice Riquelme
 Daniel Alcaíno - Darwin Soto
 Claudia Di Girolamo - Sandra
 Néstor Cantillana - Federico Ossandón
 Juana Viale - Manuela
 Tamara Acosta - Valeria
 Amparo Noguera - María Pilar Bauzá
 Felipe Braun - Cristián Covarrubias
 Peggy Cordero - Doña Amanda
 Bastián Bodenhöfer - Jorge Covarrubias
 Roxana Campos - Teresa
 Katyna Huberman - Sofía
 María Paz Grandjean - Scarlette
 Constanza Jacob - Daniella
 Diego Ruiz - Víctor
 Álvaro Salas - himself
 Isidora Cabezón - Karen
 María Angélica Díaz - Nilda

References

External links

2007 films
2000s Spanish-language films
Chilean comedy-drama films